Dr Douglas Frew Waterhouse CMG AO ForMemRS (3 June 19161 December 2000) was an Australian entomologist.

Waterhouse was the chief of the CSIRO entomology division from 1960 to 1981. He is best known for the invention of the active ingredient in Aerogard, an Australian insect repellent. He also gave his consent to the Australian Dung Beetle Project (1965-1985) which saw the introduction of dung beetles to Australia as a fly control measure. While this was a risky decision because of the threat that the dung beetles could themselves become pests or disrupt the delicate ecological balance, it proved very successful and reduced the population of bush flies by 90%.

Early life
Waterhouse was born to Eben Gowrie Waterhouse and Janet Frew Waterhouse in Sydney in 1916. He grew up at Eryldene in Gordon, a northern suburb of Sydney. The house is now preserved by a trust and open to the public.

Douglas was introduced to entomology by his uncle Athol, who would take him on butterfly collection trips. His early schooling was at Brisbane Church of England Grammar School.

Career highlights
 Educated University of Sydney (BSc 1937, MSc 1938, DSc 1952)
 CMG 1970, AO 1980. Assistant Research Officer, Division of Economic Entomology, CSIR 1938
 Captain, Australian Army Medical Corps, World War II, working in the CSIR laboratories as a CSIR officer, research, Division of Entomology
 CSIRO 1946-53, Assistant Chief, Division of Entomology
 CSIRO 1953-60, Chief 1960-81, Honorary Research Fellow 1981
 Inaugural Chairman, Canberra College of Advanced Education, 1968-90
 Consultant in Plant Protection to the Australian Centre for International Agricultural Research 1983
 Secretary (Biological Sciences), Australian Academy of Science 1961-66
 President, Australian Entomological Society 1969-72
 President, 14th International Congress of Entomology 1974
 President, International Bee Research Association 1977-78
 President, ACT Branch, National Trust of Australia 1983
 Inaugural Chancellor, University of Canberra, 1990-92

Honours and awards
 1953 David Syme Research Prize
 1954 Fellow, Australian Academy of Science
 1972 Mueller Medal
 1973 Farrer Medal
 1979 Adventures in Agricultural Science Award
 1983 Medal of the International Congress of Plant Protection
 1983 Foreign Associate, U.S. National Academy of Sciences
 1988 Australian Bicentennial Award for most outstanding living contributor to New South Wales agriculture

References

External links
 Eryldene Trust - website featuring Waterhouse's boyhood home
 Photographic portrait - National Portrait Gallery

1916 births
2000 deaths
Fellows of the Australian Academy of Science
Fellows of the Royal Society
Officers of the Order of Australia
Australian Companions of the Order of St Michael and St George
Foreign associates of the National Academy of Sciences
Australian military doctors
Australian military personnel of World War II